Fisera is a genus of moths in the family Geometridae, the geometer moths. The genus is native to Australia. The genus was erected by Francis Walker in 1860.

There are about nine species.

Species include:
Fisera belidearia
Fisera bradymorpha
Fisera dictyodes
Fisera eribola
Fisera halurga
Fisera hypoleuca
Fisera nicholsoni
Fisera perplexata
Fisera phricotypa

References

Nacophorini
Moths of Australia